Gitte Andersen (born 28 April 1977) is a Danish former football defender. She played for Brøndby IF and the Danish national team.

Andersen made 202 appearances for Brøndby between 2001 and 2009.

References

External links
 
 Danish Football Union (DBU) statistics

1977 births
Living people
Danish women's footballers
Denmark women's international footballers
Brøndby IF (women) players
Women's association football defenders
2007 FIFA Women's World Cup players